Belhaven Hill School is an independent, co-educational preparatory school for boarding and day pupils aged 5 to 13 in   Dunbar, East Lothian, Scotland. Set in 20 acres of beautiful grounds, Belhaven has an idyllic, coastal setting which both children and staff treat as their playground and home.

The current headmaster is Olly Langton.

Notable former pupils

 Hugh Buchanan (artist), Scottish artist
 James Chichester, Earl of Belfast (born 1990), aristocrat
 Alexander Elphinstone, 19th Lord Elphinstone (born 1980), aristocrat.
 Rear Admiral Sir Ronald Forrest (1923–2005), senior Royal Navy officer.
 Andro Linklater (1944–2013), writer and historian.
 Magnus Linklater (born 1942), journalist
 Hugh Trevor-Roper (1914–2003), British historian.
 Vice Admiral Sir George Vallings (1932–2007), senior Royal Navy officer.
George Baillie-Hamilton, 14th Earl of Haddington (born 1985)

References

External links
Belhaven Hill School
Inspection of Standards and Quality in Belhaven Hill School Dunbar

1923 establishments in Scotland
Educational institutions established in 1923
Preparatory schools in Scotland
Boarding schools in East Lothian
Private schools in East Lothian
Dunbar